The Illaenidae are a family of trilobites in the order Corynexochida. 223 currently accepted species in 24 genera are known from the Ordovician. Some scholars include the Panderiidae in the Illaenidae, but this is not generally supported.

Distribution 
Illaenus? priscus from Salair and Illaenus? berkutensis from the Malyi Karatau, Kazakhstan (both Lower Tremadocian), are both very poorly known and it remains uncertain to which family they could best be assigned. The first certain Illaenid is I. hinomotoensis from the Upper Tremadocian of North China and South Korea. The earliest species known from Laurentia (western Ireland) is I. weaveri, probably latest Floian. These early occurrences are from the tropics, but during the Darriwilian the family spread over southern Gondwana, and became cosmopolitan for the remainder of the Ordovician, although most genera had limited distributions.
The genus Stenopareia survived the Ordovician–Silurian extinction events and the family slightly rebounded with 26 species divided over three genera during the Silurian. Quadratillaenus tewoensis from North China is the youngest species known (Přídolí).

Genera
Bumastoides Whittington 1954
Cryptonymus Eichwald 1825
Deucalion Shtsheglov 1827
Dysplanus Burmeister 1843
Ectillaenus Salter 1867
Harpillaenus Whittington 1963
Hyboaspis Raymond 1920
Hydrolaenus Salter 1867
Illaenus Dalman 1827
Nanillaenus Jaanusson 1954
Octillaenus Salter 1867
Parillaenus Jaanusson 1954
Platillaenus Jaanusson 1954
Ptilillaenus Lu 1962
Rhodope Angelin 1854
Stenopareia Holm 1886
Thaleops Conrad 1843
Ulugtella Petrunina 1975
Zbirovia Snajdr 1956
Zdicella Snajdr 1956
Zetillaenus Snajdr 1957

References 

Ordovician trilobites
Illaenina
Trilobite families